Jacob Kastner Loghouse is a historic home located at Spring House in Lower Gwynedd Township, Montgomery County, Pennsylvania.  The log house was built about 1712 to 1754, and is a -story, English single pen plan dwelling.  It measures approximately 15 feet wide and 16 feet, 6 inches, deep and has a stone cellar. The house is covered with board and batten siding and has a purlin roof. Also on the property is a contributing well.

It was added to the National Register of Historic Places in 1996.

References

Houses on the National Register of Historic Places in Pennsylvania
Houses completed in 1754
Houses in Montgomery County, Pennsylvania
1754 establishments in Pennsylvania
National Register of Historic Places in Montgomery County, Pennsylvania